The Western Foundation of Vertebrate Zoology (WFVZ) is a non-profit charitable organization based in Camarillo, California focused on research and education on bird conservation. It hosts a natural history collection of over 200,000 sets of bird eggs representing approximately 4,000 species, around 20,000 nests, and over 56,000 bird study skins from around the world. 

It publishes a journal, the Proceedings of the Western Foundation of Vertebrate Zoology.

See also
John R. Cruttenden

References

External links
 WFVZ website

501(c)(3) organizations
Non-profit organizations based in California
Natural history museums in California